The International Musical Instrument Registry & Database, recognized formally by their acronym: IMIRAD, is an International non-governmental organization founded in Washington, DC, United States in 1999.  The organization provides musicians with low-cost or free evaluations, registrations and theft-log reports for musical instruments.  IMIRAD was founded by an international team of musical experts, educators & historians with a stated universal mission: "The preservation & embodiment of Musical Instruments, Musical Art, History & Antiquities".

Theft prevention
To deter theft and reunite musicians with lost or stolen gear, IMIRAD offers a dedicated section that allows users to report missing instruments.  As of 2020, IMIRAD does not charge for the service, which is provided to the public along with traditional musical instrument registrations.

International collaboration
In 2016 IMIRAD partnered with Hong Kong Luxury Retailer Luxify in providing registry services for all instruments showcased by the retailer.

United States collaboration
On July 4, 2020, Weymann Guitars announced that all past and future instruments will be automatically registered with IMIRAD registration service.

References

International nongovernmental organizations
1999 establishments in Washington, D.C.
Organizations based in Washington, D.C.
Musical instruments
Directories